Radekhiv is a city in Chervonohrad Raion, Lviv Oblast (region) of Ukraine. It hosts the administration of Radekhiv urban hromada, one of the hromadas of Ukraine. Population: . 

Ed Stelmach, the premier of the Canadian province of Alberta from 2006 to 2011, is descended from immigrants who arrived in Canada from Radekhiv. The town is the birthplace of Polish lawyer and government minister Kazimierz Wladyslaw Kumaniecki, Polish diplomat Marian Szumlakowski, and Polish art historian Juliusz Ross.

Until 18 July 2020, Radekhiv was the administrative center of Radekhiv Raion. The raion was abolished in July 2020 as part of the administrative reform of Ukraine, which reduced the number of raions of Lviv Oblast to seven. The area of Radekhiv Raion was merged into Chervonohrad Raion.

Gallery

References

Cities in Lviv Oblast
Tarnopol Voivodeship
Cities of district significance in Ukraine